This is an (incomplete) list of mountains in Romania. There are 12 peaks over 2,500 m in Romania.

References
 

Romania
Mountains
Romania